John Hunt Publishing is a publishing company founded in the United Kingdom in 2001, initially named O Books. The publisher has 24 active autonomous imprints, with the largest of these being the Zero Books imprint (styled Zer0 Books) founded in 2009. The Zero Books imprint was founded with the objective being to combat what they viewed as a trend of anti-intellectualism in contemporary culture.

History

John Hunt Publishing was founded in the United Kingdom in 2001, originally named O Books, a name which it continues to use as one of its imprints, in the "mind, body, and spirit" market. Its Zero Books imprint was founded by Tariq Goddard and Mark Fisher in 2009. John Hunt Publishing then underwent a major reorganization in 2010. In 2014, Goddard and Fisher left Zero Books to found another publishing house, Repeater Books.
Since 2014 the imprint has been run by Douglas Lain along with Ashley Frawley and C Derick Varn and has published critically acclaimed books such as Kill All Normies and Zen City.  The imprint began publishing a series called Neglected or Misunderstood in 2017 with the aim of covering "neglected or misunderstood" left-wing theorists such as Shulamith Firestone and Theodor Adorno. Zero Books states that their goal is to utilize critical theory to "publish books that make our readers uncomfortable" in order to "reinvent the left".

John Hunt Publishing "deals directly with authors" and does not require they have an agent. However, in the mid-2010s it was stated that "because they are a small publisher, they are unable to pay advances, so [authors] have to wait for the royalties to roll in". Imprints of John Hunt Publishing offer four “levels” of publishing based on the likely popularity of the book, with both “traditional publishing deals and what it describes as co-operative publishing for authors,” with about a quarter of books, most prevalently those in fiction, being published “under co-operative terms,” though this will vary by imprint. The company also says that "every title gets treated the same. No bookshop or reviewer is going to know if one title or another has had a subsidy." As with other imprints operations are controlled by authors themselves, who "have gravitated to being involved in publishing, whether coming up through editing, design or marketing." This multiple-imprint author-centric style has been described as, "It can’t work. It shouldn’t work. Yet, somehow, John Hunt Publishing is making it work." A central corporate office continues to manage sales, accounts, and royalties for all imprints. As of 2014, the company was publishing "approximately 300 titles per year with global sales and a focus on physical stores."

On October 23, 2021, Repeater Books announced that they had bought the Zero Books imprint from John Hunt Publishing. Then, two days later on October 25, 2021, it was announced that Watkins Books owner Etan Ilfeld had purchased John Hunt Publishing from John Hunt.

Imprints
As of 2018, the active imprints of John Hunt Publishing are described as:
6th Books -- ALL THINGS PARANORMAL
Axis Mundi Books -- EXPLORING THE WORLD OF HIDDEN KNOWLEDGE
AYNI BOOKS -- ALTERNATIVE HEALTH & HEALING
Business Books -- FRESH THINKING FOR THE BUSINESS WORLD
Changemakers Books -- TRANSFORMATION
Compass Books -- PRACTICAL BOOKS FOR AUTHORS
Chronos Books -- HISTORY
Christian Alternative -- THE NEW OPEN SPACES
Circle Books -- CHRISTIAN FAITH
Cosmic Egg Books -- FANTASY, SCIENCE FICTION & HORROR
Dodona Books -- ASTROLOGY, NUMEROLOGY AND GENERAL DIVINATION
Earth Books -- ENVIRONMENT
Iff Books -- ACADEMIC AND SPECIALIST
Liberalis -- LIBERAL ARTS EDUCATION & STORYTELLING
Lodestone Books -- YOUNG ADULT FICTION
MANTRA BOOKS -- EASTERN RELIGION & PHILOSOPHY
Moon Books -- PAGANISM & SHAMANISM
O-BOOKS -- SPIRITUALITY
Our Street Books -- JUVENILE FICTION, NON-FICTION, PARENTING
PSYCHE BOOKS -- PSYCHOLOGY
Roundfire -- FICTION
Soul Rocks -- NEW GENERATION
Top Hat Books -- HISTORICAL FICTION
Zero Books -- CULTURE, SOCIETY & POLITICS

Former or inactive imprints are:
Perfect Edge -- "Fiction for those who know fiction matters" (noted on the website as "no longer receiving submissions")
Bedroom Books -- ROMANCE AND SEXY-TIME
Gaming Books -- CARD AND BOARD GAMES
Sassy Books -- BADASS BOOKS FOR GO-FOR-IT GIRLS

Authors 
Some notable authors published through John Hunt Publishing include: Andrez Bergen, Frithjof Bergmann, Danielle Collobert, David Fontana, Nicholas Hagger, Leslie Scalapino, David W. Berner Jonathan Dapra and Steve Taylor. Authors published through the Zero Books imprint include: Angela Nagle, Mark Fisher, Tariq Goddard, David Stubbs, Guy Mankowski, Adam Kotsko, Owen Hatherley, Cliff Slaughter, Anselm Jappe, Laurie Penny, Nina Power, Grafton Tanner, Eugene Thacker, Gilad Atzmon, David Cromwell.

See also 
Zero Books
Capitalist Realism: Is There No Alternative? (2009), by Mark Fisher
Meat Market: Female Flesh Under Capitalism (2011), by  Laurie Penny
Continuity and Rupture: Philosophy in the Maoist Terrain (2016), by  J. Moufawad-Paul
Kill All Normies (2017), by Angela Nagle
Marx Returns (2018), by Jason Barker

References

External links

Twitter page
Facebook page
YouTube page
Inside Zero Books Patreon Site

Political book publishing companies
British companies established in 2001